Karl Otto Lagerfeld (10 September 1933 – 19 February 2019) was a German fashion designer, creative director, artist and photographer.

He was known as the creative director of the French fashion house Chanel, a position held from 1983 until his death, and was also creative director of the Italian fur and leather goods fashion house Fendi, and of his own eponymous fashion label. He collaborated on a variety of fashion and art-related projects.

Lagerfeld was recognized for his signature white hair, black sunglasses, fingerless gloves, and high, starched, detachable collars.

Early life
Lagerfeld was born on 10 September 1933 in Hamburg, to Elisabeth (née Bahlmann) and businessman Otto Lagerfeld. His father owned a company that produced and imported evaporated milk; while his maternal grandfather, Karl Bahlmann, was a local politician for the Catholic Centre Party. His family belonged to the Old Catholic Church. When Lagerfeld's mother met his father, she was a lingerie saleswoman from Berlin. His parents married in 1930.

Lagerfeld was known to misrepresent his birth year, claiming to be younger than his actual age, and to misrepresent his parents' background. For example, he claimed that he was born in 1938 to "Elisabeth of Germany" and Otto Ludwig Lagerfeldt from Sweden. These claims have been conclusively proven to be false, as his father was from Hamburg and spent his entire life in Germany, with no Swedish connection. There is also no evidence that his mother Elisabeth Bahlmann, the daughter of a middle-class local politician, called herself "Elisabeth of Germany". He was known to insist that no one knows his real birth date. In an interview on French television in February 2009, Lagerfeld said that he was "born neither in 1933 nor 1938".

In April 2013, he finally declared that he was born in 1935. A birth announcement was, however, published by his parents in 1933, and the baptismal register in Hamburg also lists him as born in that year, showing that he was born on 10 September 1933. Bild am Sonntag published his baptismal records in 2008 and interviewed his teacher and a classmate, who both confirmed that he was born in 1933. The same was later confirmed by his death record. Despite that, Karl Lagerfeld announced publicly that he was celebrating his "70th birthday" on 10 September 2008, despite actually turning 75.

His older sister, Martha Christiane "Christel", was born in 1931. Lagerfeld had an older half-sister, Theodora Dorothea "Thea", from his father's first marriage. His family name has been spelled both Lagerfeldt (with a "t") and Lagerfeld. Like his father, he used the spelling Lagerfeld, considering it to "sound more commercial".

His family was mainly shielded from the deprivations of World War II due to his father's business interests in Germany through the firm Glücksklee-Milch GmbH. His father had been in San Francisco during the 1906 earthquake.

As a child, he showed great interest in visual arts, and former schoolmates recalled that he was always making sketches "no matter what we were doing in class". Lagerfeld told interviewers that he learned much more by constantly visiting the Kunsthalle Hamburg museum than he ever did in school.

Creative mind-set

Baroque and Bildung - and Rococo 
Karl Lagerfeld's fashion and design were deeply connected to European culture. Lagerfeld was a mirror of 20th century history. With his passing, one of the last figures from the 'world of yesterday' disappeared.

Pertinent are dual strands of Lagerfeld's mind-set, which can be termed Baroque and Bildung. Thus, there was the significance for Lagerfeld of Baroque allegory and folds and folding (cf. Gilles Deleuze: The Fold. Leibniz and the Baroque, University of Minnesota Press, 1992), and of Bildung self-formation with the acquisition of new cultural knowledge, as a wellspring of Lagerfeld's fashion historicism and future-orientedness. Apart from the many Rococo affiliations of Lagerfeld's fashion design, personal style, and interior decorating, Lagerfeld also evoked the Rococo in his art-photography, as for instance in his series of photos inspired by Daphnis and Chloé, which suggest the painterly pastorals done by eighteenth-century French artists like François Boucher.

Career

Early career, Chloé, and Fendi (1954–1982)
In 1954, Lagerfeld submitted a dress design to the International Wool Secretariat's design competition that presaged the chemise dresses that would be introduced by Givenchy and Balenciaga in 1957.

In 1955, after living in Paris for two years, Lagerfeld entered a coat design competition sponsored by the International Wool Secretariat. He won the coat category and befriended Yves Saint Laurent, who won the dress category, and was soon after hired by Pierre Balmain. He worked as Balmain's assistant, and later apprentice, for three years.

In 1958, Lagerfeld became the artistic director for Jean Patou. In 1964, he went to Rome to study art history and work for Tiziani but was soon designing freelance for a multitude of brands, including Charles Jourdan, Chloé, Krizia, and Valentino.

In 1967, he was hired by Fendi to modernize their fur line. Lagerfeld's innovative designs proved groundbreaking, as he introduced the use of mole, rabbit, and squirrel pelts into high fashion. Lagerfeld remained with Fendi Rome until his death.

In the 1970s, his work for Chloé made him one of the most prominent designers in the world, often vying with Yves Saint Laurent for most influential. After a period in the early seventies when he toyed with styles from the 1930s and '50s, in 1974 he contributed to the burgeoning Big Look or Soft Look by eliminating linings, padding, and even hemming from voluminous, thin-fabric garments, even from fur in his work for Fendi at the time, to enable an unencumbered, comfortable, layered style that would dominate the high fashion of the middle of the decade.

After refining this style and saying that to go back to linings and stiff structure would be regressive, he did a complete about-face in 1978 and joined other designers in showing the heavily constructed, huge-shouldered, more restrictive looks that would dominate the 1980s, presenting such an exaggerated retro 1940s-50s silhouette – immense shoulder pads; severe, stiffly constructed suits with padded lampshade peplums; padded busts and hips; impractically tight skirts; awkwardly high spike heels; hats; gloves; even boned corsets – that his work did not look out of place alongside similar retro fare from Thierry Mugler of the period.

During both these phases, his mid-seventies Soft Look phase and his late seventies-eighties big-shoulders phase, his love of the eighteenth century was frequently on display. For instance, his Fall 1977 collection, one of the most celebrated of the seventies Soft Look era, included lace trim, headwear, and thigh-high boots in styles from the 1700s, while his Fall 1979 collection, one of the most influential of the early years of the big-shoulder era, contained millinery that recalled Napoleonic bicornes, along with button-sided spats/leggings that looked somewhat like military accoutrements from the same period.

Lagerfeld would continue in the shoulder pads-tight skirts-stiletto heels direction into the eighties, joining other, similar designers in shortening the skirts of the look even as high as mini length, though his hemlines could also range as low as the ankle. Alongside these styles, he also showed softer, more comfortable clothing, particularly in 1981-'82, when a brief revival of somewhat mid-seventies-looking long dirndl skirts and shawls appeared on runways and Lagerfeld touted the gossamer weightlessness he had perfected in the seventies, although he did like to place corsets and girdles over it now. The variety of lengths and trouser shapes he presented during this period kept him in line with modern women's needs.

International fame with Chanel (1982–2000)

In the 1980s, Lagerfeld was hired by Chanel, which was considered a "near-dead brand" at the time since the death of designer Coco Chanel a decade prior. Taking over the couture there in 1983, Lagerfeld brought life back into the company, making it a huge success by revamping its ready-to-wear fashion line. Lagerfeld integrated the interlocked "CC" monograph of Coco Chanel into a style pattern for the House of Chanel.

Lagerfeld also changed the Chanel silhouette that had prevailed since the early 1960s, making it more eighties by padding the shoulder, shortening and tightening the skirt, raising the heel, and enlarging or miniaturizing the jewelry and purses, all controversial moves, especially the short skirts, as Mlle. Chanel had always disapproved of above-the-knee skirts. This new direction was actually initiated the year before Lagerfeld took the helm, 1982, when a design team led by Hervé Léger, a Lagerfeld protegé, operated at the house. Lagerfeld is suspected of having influenced Léger's changes.

In 1984, a year after his start at Chanel, Lagerfeld began his own eponymous "Karl Lagerfeld" brand. The brand was established to channel "intellectual sexiness".

Lagerfeld flourished in the plethora of historical revivals of the eighties, from the shoulder-padded 1940s-50s revivals beginning in 1978 and continuing through the eighties, to the 1950s pouf skirts, 1860s crinolines, and hoops of the mid-eighties, now often showgirl-short. Lagerfeld participated in it all, for both his namesake line and Chanel. In 1986, he marked the move away from broad shoulders by removing pads from the shoulders and placing them visibly on the outside of the hips.

Later career (2001–2019)

Fashion
In 2002, Lagerfeld asked Renzo Rosso, the founder of Diesel, to collaborate with him on a special denim collection for the Lagerfeld Gallery. The collection, Lagerfeld Gallery by Diesel, was co-designed by Lagerfeld and then developed by Diesel's creative team, under the supervision of Rosso. It consisted of five pieces that were presented during the designer's catwalk shows during Paris Fashion Week and then sold in highly limited editions at the Lagerfeld Galleries in Paris and Monaco and at the Diesel Denim Galleries in New York and Tokyo. During the first week of sales in New York, more than 90% of the trousers were sold out, even though prices ranged from $240 to $1,840. In a statement after the show in Paris, Rosso said: "I am honored to have met this fashion icon of our time. Karl represents creativity, tradition and challenge, and the fact that he thought of Diesel for this collaboration is a great gift and acknowledgement of our reputation as the prêt-à-porter of casual wear".

In December 2006, Lagerfeld announced the launch of a new collection for men and women dubbed K Karl Lagerfeld, which included fitted T-shirts and a wide range of jeans. In September 2010, the Couture Council of The Museum at the Fashion Institute of Technology presented Lagerfeld with an award created for him, The Couture Council Fashion Visionary Award, at a benefit luncheon at Avery Fisher Hall, in New York City. In November 2010, Lagerfeld and Swedish crystal manufacturer Orrefors announced a collaboration to design a crystal art collection. The first collection was launched in spring 2011, called Orrefors by Karl Lagerfeld.

In 2012 Lagerfeld released his photo-book The Little Black Jacket which featured entertainers, models, and friends of his.

In 2014, Palm Beach Modern Auctions announced that many of Lagerfeld's early sketches for the House of Tiziani in Rome would be sold.

Lagerfeld's work in fashion houses garnered him to be considered the Chameleon of fashion. Said by Anna Sui and Clare Waight Keller, they emphasized Lagerfeld's ability to elevate the rich history of fashion houses into the modern-day context. 

In November 2015, Karl Lagerfeld was presented with the Outstanding Achievement Award at the British Fashion Awards. Anna Wintour, Editor in Chief of American Vogue, presented the award.

Final collection 
The final Chanel collection completed before his death had an Alpine theme of après-ski clothing. As Lagerfeld requested not to have any type of funeral, the show only included a moment of silence in his honor and chairs emblazoned with his image next to Coco Chanel with the saying "the beat goes on". Although Lagerfeld shunned any emotional reactions around the idea of his death, some models could be seen crying on the runway, as well as audience members.

Other media
Lagerfeld and investments enterprise Dubai Infinity Holdings (DIH) signed a deal to design limited edition homes on the island of Isla Moda. A feature-length documentary film on the designer, Lagerfeld Confidential, was made by Vogue in 2007. Later in the year, Lagerfeld was made the host of the fictional radio station K109—the studio in the video game Grand Theft Auto IV, and its DLCs The Lost & Damned and The Ballad of Gay Tony.

In 2008, he created a teddy bear in his likeness produced by Steiff in an edition of 2,500 that sold for $1,500. and has been immortalized in many forms, which include pins, shirts, dolls, and more. In 2009, Tra Tutti began selling Karl Lagermouse and Karl Lagerfelt, which are mini-Lagerfelds in the forms of mice and finger puppets, respectively. The same year, he lent his voice to the French animated film, Totally Spies! The Movie.

Late in life, Lagerfeld realized one of his boyhood ambitions by becoming a professional caricaturist – from 2013, his political cartoons were regularly published in the German newspaper Frankfurter Allgemeine Zeitung. 

In 2013, he directed the short film Once Upon a Time... in the Cité du Cinéma, Saint-Denis, by Luc Besson, featuring Keira Knightley in the role of Coco Chanel and Clotilde Hesme as her aunt Adrienne Chanel. In June 2016, it was announced that Lagerfeld would design the two residential lobbies of the Estates at Acqualina, a residential development in Miami's Sunny Isles Beach.

In October 2018, Lagerfeld in collaboration with Carpenters Workshop Gallery launched an art collection of functional sculptures titled Architectures. Sculptures were made of Arabescato Fantastico, a rare vibrant white marble with dark gray veins and black Nero Marquina marble with milky veins. Inspired by antiquity and referred to as modern mythology the ensemble consists of gueridons, tables, lamps, consoles, fountains and mirrors.

Personal life
Lagerfeld was recognized for his signature white hair, black sunglasses, fingerless gloves, and high, starched detachable collars.

He had an 18-year relationship with the French aristocrat, model, and socialite Jacques de Bascher (1951–1989), though Lagerfeld said that the liaison never became sexual. "I infinitely loved that boy," Lagerfeld reportedly said of de Bascher, "but I had no physical contact with him. Of course, I was seduced by his physical charm." De Bascher also had an affair with the couturier Yves Saint-Laurent; subsequently, Saint-Laurent's business partner and former lover Pierre Bergé accused Lagerfeld of being behind a gambit to destabilize the rival fashion house. De Bascher died of AIDS in 1989 while Lagerfeld stayed on a cot at his bedside in his hospital room during the final stages of his illness.

Following Lagerfeld's death, tabloids reported that he was to be cremated and his ashes mixed with those of de Bascher, which Lagerfeld kept in an urn, or with those of his mother.

Lagerfeld lived in numerous homes over the years: an apartment in the rue de l'Université in Paris, decorated in the Art Deco style (1970s); the 18th-century Chateau de Penhoët in Brittany, decorated in the Rococo style (1970s to 2000); an apartment in Monte Carlo decorated until 2000 in 1980s Memphis style (from the early 1980s); the Villa Jako in Blankenese in Hamburg, decorated in the Art Deco style (mid-1990s to 2000); the Villa La Vigie in Monaco (the 1990s to 2000), a 17th-century mansion (hôtel particulier) in the Rue de l'Université in Paris, decorated in the Rococo and other styles (1980s to the 2000s); an apartment in Manhattan, although he never moved into or decorated it (2006 to 2012); the summer villa El Horria in Biarritz, decorated in the modern style (1990s–2006); and a house dating from the 1840s in Vermont (from the 2000s). From 2007, Lagerfeld owned an 1820s house in Paris in Quai Voltaire decorated in modern and Art Deco style.

A spread with pictures inside Lagerfeld's apartments in Paris and Monaco was published in Vogue. He also revealed his vast collection of Suzanne Belperron's pins and brooches and used the color of one of her blue chalcedony rings as the starting point for the Chanel spring/summer 2012 collection.

Lagerfeld owned a red point Birman cat named Choupette, which, in June 2013, he indicated he would marry, if it were legal.

Weight loss
Lagerfeld lost  in 2001. He explained: "I suddenly wanted to dress differently, to wear clothes designed by Hedi Slimane ... But these fashions, modeled by very, very slim boys—and not men my age—required me to lose at least 40 kg. It took me exactly 13 months." The diet was created specially for him by Dr. Jean-Claude Houdret, which led to a book called The Karl Lagerfeld Diet. He promoted it on Larry King Live and other television shows.

Book collecting
Lagerfeld was a passionate book collector and amassed one of the largest personal libraries in the world. According to the Rare Book Hub, he was quoted as saying, "Today, I only collect books; there is no room left for something else. If you go to my house, I'll have you walk around the books. I ended up with a library of 300,000. It's a lot for an individual."

Death and tributes
Following health complications in January 2019, Lagerfeld was admitted to the American Hospital of Paris in Parisian suburb Neuilly-sur-Seine on 18 February. He died there the following morning from complications of pancreatic cancer. Lagerfeld requested no formal funeral with plans for cremation and ashes spread at secret locations alongside his mother as well as his late partner, Jacques de Bascher.

Lagerfeld was memorialized on 20 June 2019 at the Grand Palais with "Karl For Ever", a celebration of the designer's life, which featured a career retrospective highlighting his tenures at Chloé, Fendi, and Chanel. The 90-minute tribute was attended by 2,500 guests. Nearly 60 gigantic portraits were on view within the pavilion, which has hosted many Chanel runway collections. The ceremony also included readings and musical performances by Tilda Swinton, Cara Delevingne, Helen Mirren, Pharrell Williams, and Lang Lang. The production was staged by theater and opera director Robert Carsen.

Following the memorial, the house of Karl Lagerfeld announced in July 2019 the development of "The White Shirt Project". In homage to its eponymous founder, this collaboration celebrates the late designer's legacy with a collection of reimagined, iconic white shirts.

Lagerfeld once said: "If you ask me what I'd most like to have invented in fashion, I'd say the white shirt. For me, the white shirt is the basis of everything. Everything else comes after."

The global project, which was curated by Karl Lagerfeld Style Adviser Carine Roitfeld, features designs from Cara Delevingne, Kate Moss, Tommy Hilfiger, Diane Kruger, Takashi Murakami, Amber Valletta, and British street artist, Endless, amongst others.

Seven was Lagerfeld's favorite number, and as such, seven of the final designs will be replicated 77 times and sold for €777 each from 26 September 2019. All proceeds will benefit the French charity Sauver La Vie, which funds medical research at the Paris Descartes University.

In 2023 his biography, PARADISE NOW: The Extraordinary Life of Karl Lagerfeld written by William Middleton (writer), was published by HarperCollins.

Controversies 

During his career, Lagerfeld faced many controversies and was accused of being fatphobic, Islamophobic, and of opposing the Me Too movement.

There was much controversy from Lagerfeld's use of a verse from the Qur'an in his spring 1994 couture collection for Chanel, despite apologies from the designer and the fashion house. The controversy erupted after the 1994 couture show in Paris, when the Indonesian Muslim Scholars Council in Jakarta called for a boycott of Chanel and threatened to file formal protests with the government of Lagerfeld's homeland, Germany. The designer apologized, explaining that he had taken the design from a book about the Taj Mahal, thinking the words came from a love poem.

Lagerfeld was a supporter of the use of fur in fashion, although he himself did not wear fur and hardly ate meat. In a BBC interview in 2009, he claimed that hunters "make a living having learnt nothing else than hunting, killing those beasts who would kill us if they could" and maintained: "In a meat-eating world, wearing leather for shoes and clothes and even handbags, the discussion of fur is childish." Spokespersons for People for the Ethical Treatment of Animals (PETA) called Lagerfeld "a fashion dinosaur who is as out of step as his furs are out of style", and "particularly delusional with his kill-or-be-killed mentality. When was the last time a person's life was threatened by a mink or rabbit?" In 2001, he was the target of a pieing at a fashion premiere at Lincoln Center in New York City. However, the tofu pies hurled by animal rights activists in protest against his use of fur within his collections went astray, instead hitting Calvin Klein. A PETA spokesperson described the hit on Klein as "friendly fire", calling Klein, who does not use fur, "a great friend to the animals" and Lagerfeld a "designer dinosaur", who continues to use fur in his collections. In 2010, after Lagerfeld used fake fur in his 2010 Chanel collection, PETA's website claimed: "It's the triumph of fake fur ... because fake fur changed so much and became so great now that you can hardly see a difference".

Lagerfeld in 2009 joined critics of supermodel Heidi Klum, following German designer Wolfgang Joop's remarks about Klum, who had posed naked on the cover of the German edition of GQ magazine. Joop described Klum as being "no runway model. She is simply too heavy and has too big a bust". Lagerfeld commented that neither he nor Claudia Schiffer knew Klum, as she had never worked in Paris, and that she was insignificant in the world of high fashion, being "more bling bling and glamorous than current fashion". He created an international furore on 9 February 2012, when he called the singer Adele "a little too fat." Adele responded that she is like the majority of women, and she is very proud of that fact. Lagerfeld later caused another controversy, on 31 July 2012, when he criticised Pippa Middleton, the sister of Catherine, Duchess of Cambridge, for her looks.

His caricature drawing Harvey Schweinstein, that shows film producer Harvey Weinstein as a pig, was criticised as antisemitic and dehumanizing. He sparked controversy by criticizing German Chancellor Angela Merkel's immigration policy during the European migrant crisis by saying, "You cannot kill millions of Jews and then take in millions of their worst enemies afterwards, even if there are decades [between the events]", and by accusing her to have thereby caused the rise of the party Alternative for Germany (AfD).

Lagerfeld stated in 2007 that his controversial persona was an act.

References

External links

  
 The New Yorker: John Colapinto: "In the Now: Where Karl Lagerfeld Lives." Extensive profile (c. 10,000 words)
 The Independent: Susannah Frankel (5 November 2011): "Being Karl Lagerfeld: What's it like being the most powerful man in fashion?"
 

1933 births
2019 deaths
20th-century German people
21st-century German people
Businesspeople from Hamburg
Chanel people
Commandeurs of the Légion d'honneur
Deaths from cancer in France
Deaths from pancreatic cancer
Eyewear brands of France
Fashion photographers
Gay photographers
German expatriates in France
German expatriates in Monaco
German fashion businesspeople
German fashion designers
German Old Catholics
High fashion brands
LGBT fashion designers
German gay artists
German LGBT photographers
Officers Crosses of the Order of Merit of the Federal Republic of Germany